Gabon has followed a non-aligned policy, advocating dialogue in international affairs and recognizing both parts of divided countries. Since 1973, the number of countries establishing diplomatic relations with Gabon has doubled. In inter-African affairs, Gabon espouses development by evolution rather than revolution and favors regulated free enterprise as the system most likely to promote rapid economic growth. Concerned about stability in Central Africa and the potential for intervention, Gabon has been directly involved with mediation efforts in Chad, Central African Republic, Republic of Congo, Angola, and former Zaire. In December 1999, through the mediation efforts of President Bongo, a peace accord was signed in the Republic of Congo between the government and most leaders of an armed rebellion. President Bongo has remained involved in the continuing Congolese peace process. Gabon has been a strong proponent of regional stability, and Gabonese armed forces played an important role in the UN Peacekeeping Mission to the Central African Republic (MINURCA).

Gabon is a member of the UN and some of its specialized and related agencies, including the World Bank; Organisation of African Unity (OAU); Central African Customs Union (UDEAC/CEMAC); EC association under Lome Convention; Communaute Financiere Africaine (CFA); Organisation of Islamic Cooperation (OIC); Non-Aligned Movement; Organization of Petroleum Exporting Countries (OPEC).

Gabon is also a member of the International Criminal Court with a Bilateral Immunity Agreement of protection for the US-military (as covered under Article 98).

Bilateral relations

Notable people 
 

 Paul Bie-Eyene, Gabonese diplomat

See also 
 List of diplomatic missions in Gabon
 List of diplomatic missions of Gabon

References 

 
Government of Gabon
Politics of Gabon